Hamne Gandhi Ko Maar Diya is a Hindi movie produced and directed by Naeem A. Siddqui. It was released on 2 March 2018 all over India, this movie is inspired by non-violence movements taken by Mahatma Gandhi (Mohan Das Karamchand Gandhi) during his struggle for Independent India from 1915 to 1947. The film was originally titled as Hey Ram Humne Gandhi Ko Maar Diya, but the name was snipped by the Central Board of Film Certification.

Plot
This is a story is of two completely opposite ideologies, about two strangers who met in a train journey in the panorama of 28 January 1948. Amidst the environment of terror, communal riots and fear, on one side there is Kailash (Jatin Goswami), who is going to meet his mother, Savitri (Pratima Kazmi) from Calcutta to Sasaram, along with his wife, Sudha (Sameeksha Bhatnager) and a daughter. On the other side, Divakar (Subrat Dutta) is going to his village to take the responsibility as a teacher. Kailash had lost his everything in the "Action-day" in Calcutta and has a strong belief that Gandhi ji was responsible for the partition of our country. On the other side, Divakar has his own arguments and believes in Gandhi ji's philosophy of non-violence, tolerance, and embracing all the religions. Events happened during the two days journey, had different impacts on these two individuals and reactions to the events by both Kailash and Divakar, forces to think who is right and who is wrong. When they reaches their destination and ends the journey, they got to know that  Gandhi ji was assassinated. Gandhi ji's assassination and events happened after that becomes reflection of the two different ideologies.

Cast
 Pratima Kazmi
 Subrat Dutta
 Samiksha Bhatnagar
 Jatin Goswami

Release
The new poster was unveiled on 31 January 2018, coinciding with the death anniversary of Mahatma Gandhi. The official trailer of the film was released by Touchwood Multimedia Creations on 5 February 2018. The theatrical trailer of the film was released by Touchwood Multimedia Creations on 23 February 2018.

The film was theatrically released on 2 March 2018.

References

External links
 

2018 films
Indian drama films
2018 drama films
2010s Hindi-language films
Hindi-language drama films